Kou Wei (born October 1961) is a Chinese executive and politician of Bai ethnicity who served as chairman of the State Grid Corporation of China from December 2018 to January 2020 and chairman of China Datang Corporation from 2020 to 2021.

He was an alternate member of the 19th Central Committee of the Chinese Communist Party.

Biography
Kou was born in Jianchuan County, Yunnan, in October 1961, and graduated from Yunnan Institute of Technology (now Kunming University of Science and Technology) and Huazhong University of Science and Technology.

He successively worked at Yangzonghai Power Plant, Yunnan Electric Power Industry Bureau, Yunnan Manwan Power Plant, Yunnan Electric Power Industry Bureau, Yunnan Electric Power Group Co., Ltd., Yunnan Lancang River Hydropower Development Co., Ltd., Huaneng Lancang River Hydropower Co., Ltd., and China Huaneng. He was general manager of the State Grid Corporation of China in July 2016, and subsequently chairman in December 2018. He was general manager of China Datang Corporation in January 2020, and soon after rose to become chairman, and served until his resignation in June 2021.

References

1961 births
Living people
Bai people
People from Jianchuan County
Kunming University of Science and Technology alumni
Huazhong University of Science and Technology alumni
People's Republic of China politicians from Yunnan
Chinese Communist Party politicians from Yunnan
Alternate members of the 19th Central Committee of the Chinese Communist Party